Dgroups is a partnership of international development organisations working together towards a common vision: A world where every person is able to contribute to dialogue and decision-making for international development and social justice. The platform is administered by the Partner Members of the Dgroups Foundation (below).

Brief history 
Dgroups - Development through dialogue - was set up in 2002 as an online platform offering tools and services that bring individuals and organisations together in the international development community.

Dgroups started as a joint initiative of seven development organisations: Bellanet/IDRC, the Department for International Development (DFID) (DFID), the Institute for Connectivity in the Americas (ICA), the International Institute for Communication and Development (IICD), OneWorld, the Joint UN Programme on HIV/AIDS (UNAIDS) and the 
UN Economic Commission for Africa (UNECA). These organisations were looking for an online communication tool that would suit their needs for target groups in the developing world, as well as other development practitioners worldwide. As none of the existing knowledge sharing applications were considered suitable, they decided to join forces and build their own system starting from an existing Bellanet platform. Dgroups is online since 2003.

After having grown and matured in Bellanet/IDRC as a project, in March 2009 Dgroups members decided that an independent legal entity was needed at the heart of the partnership and the Dgroups Foundation was established in the Netherlands. The Dgroups Foundation now governs the development and running of the platform and related online services.

Dgroups platform 
The Dgroups platform is designed and developed keeping in mind low-bandwidth users. Thus exchanges occur mainly via email, using electronic mailing lists. The Dgroups platform offers online tools and services needed to support the activities of a team, a group, a network, a partnership or a community.

Dgroups supports more than 800 active communities of practice, with more than 270,000 registered users. It delivers around 500.000 email messages each day, half of which are exchanged with and within African countries.

Dgroups Foundation 

As of February 2017 the Dgroups Foundation comprises 16 Full Partners and 7 Associate Partners.

Full Partners: 
 CIDSE
 CTA - Technical Centre for Agricultural and Rural Cooperation ACP-EU
 DFID - Department for International Development
 ECDPM - European Centre for Development Policy Management
 FAO - Food and Agriculture Organization of the United Nations)
 FARA - Forum for Agricultural Research in Africa
 Hivos - Humanist Institute for Co-operation with Developing Countries
 IDS - Institute of Development Studies
 INASP - International Network for the Availability of Scientific Publications
 Rural Water Supply Network
 SNV - Netherlands Development Organisation
 SDC - Swiss Agency for Development and Cooperation
 THET - Tropical Health & Education Trust
 UNCDF - United Nations Capital Development Fund
 UNECA - United Nations Economic Commission for Africa
 UNISDR - United Nations Office for Disaster Risk Reduction

Associate Partners:
 Access Agriculture
 Alfa Redi
 cinfo 
 Euforic Services
 Ricardo Wilson-Grau Consultoria em Gestão Empresarial Ltda
 Savana Signature
 The Broker Online

References

Notes
Sarah Cummings. 2008. Development through dialogue: report of a research initiative. KIT Working Paper I1
Andrea Carvajal, Odilia Mayorga, and Boru Douthwaite. 2008 Forming a community of practice to strengthen the capacities of learning and knowledge sharing centres in Latin America and the Caribbean: a Dgroup case study. Knowledge Management for Development Journal, Vol 4, No 1
Giacomo Rambaldi. 2007. Using a dgroup with third party online applications for a cause. Knowledge Management for Development Journal, Vol 3, No 1
Titi Akinsamni, Andrea Aranguren, Manju Chatani, Nynke Kruiderink and Theresa Stanton. 2007. Development through Dialogue. A showcase of Dgroups from three perspectives; institutional, project and capacity development level. Knowledge Management for Development Journal, Vol 3, No 1

External links

DGroups website
DGroups discussion platform
DGroups Help pages
DGroups Blog

 
Internet forums
Collaboration
Knowledge markets
Social information processing
Social networks for social change